Won is a single-syllable Korean given name, and an element in many two-syllable Korean given names. Its meaning differs based on the hanja used to write it. There are 46 Hanja with the reading "won" on the South Korean government's official list of hanja which may be registered for use in given names.

In given names
Given names formed with the syllable "Won" include:

First syllable
Masculine
Won-ho
Won-hyo
Won-il
Won-jae
Won-jong
Won-joong
Won-jun
Won-kyu
Won-seh
Won-seok
Won-sung
Won-tae
Won-woo

Unisex
Won-hee
Won-jin
Won-ju
Won-jung
Won-kyo
Won-young

Feminine
Won-kyung
Won-sook

Second syllable
Masculine
Dae-won
Do-won
Dong-won
Gi-won
Hyung-won
Jae-won
Jong-won
Joong-won
Kyu-won
Sang-won
Se-won
Soo-won
Seung-won
Sang-won
Seong-won
Tae-won

Unisex
Hae-won
Hee-won
Hyo-won
Ji-won
Joo-won
Jung-won
Kyung-won
Rae-won
Ree-won
Seo-won
Si-won
Yo-won
Young-won

Feminine
Chae-won
Hye-won
So-won
Ye-won

People
People with the syllable "Won" include:

Kim So-won (born 1935), South Korean actress and former female voice actor
Jeon Won-ju (born 1939), South Korean actress and former female voice actor
Park Jie-won (born 1942), South Korean politician
Kim Se-won (born 1945), South Korean female voice actor
Rhie Won-bok (born 1946), South Korean cartoonist and professor
Kim Chae-won (born 1946), South Korean writer
Park Won-sook (born 1949), South Korean actress
Chang Do-won (born 1954), Korean American businessman, founder and owner of Forever 21
Kim Hyo-won (born 1954), South Korean actor
Park Won-soon (born 1956), South Korean lawyer who currently serves as the Mayor of Seoul
Kim Won-soo (born 1956), South Korean diplomat, disarmament officer and deputy Secretary-General of the United Nations
Lee Won-jae (born 1958), South Korean actor
Jung Won-joong (born 1960), South Korean actor
Park Jung-won (born 1962), South Korean businessman, chairman of Doosan Group, owner of Doosan Bears and chairman of Doosan E & C
Na Kyung-won (born 1963), South Korean politician and lawyer
Lee Sang-won (born 1965), South Korean singer
Lee Won-jong (born 1966), South Korean actor
Do Ji-won (born 1968), South Korean actress
Lee Jong-won (born 1969), South Korean actor
Choi Jung-won (born 1969), South Korean actress
Kim Hee-won (born 1971), South Korean actor
Kim Won-hee (born 1972), South Korean television presenter and actress
Ryu Si-won (born 1972), South Korean actor and singer
Lim Chae-won (born Lim Kyung-ok, 1972), South Korean actress
Kim Shi-won (born 1973), South Korean actress
Ye Ji-won (born 1973), South Korean actress
Kim So-won (born 1973), South Korean announcer
Kim Won-jun (born 1973), South Korean singer and actor
Lee Won-suk (born 1974), South Korean film director
Shin Won-ho (born 1975), South Korean director and television producer
Choi Won-young (born 1976), South Korean actor
Ham So-won (born 1976), South Korean actress
Won-bin (born 1977), South Korean actor
Kim Joo-won (born 1977), South Korean prima ballerina
Uhm Ji-won (born 1977), South Korean actress
Ha Ji-won (born Jeon Hae-rim, 1978), South Korean actress
Eun Ji-won (born 1978), South Korean male rapper
Kim Won-seok (born 1978), South Korean television director
Lee Won-il (born 1979), South Korean chef and television personality
Lee Hye-won (born 1979), South Korean model, Miss Korea FILA in 1999 and wife of football player and broadcaster Ahn Jung-hwan
Lee Yo-won (born 1980), South Korean actress
Kang Ye-won (born 1980), South Korean actress
Moon Hye-won (born 1980), South Korean singer-songwriter, composer and musical actress
Moon Jeong-won (born 1980), South Korean florist and wife of TV presenter, comedian, actor, and singer Lee Hwi-jae
Jang Su-won (born 1980), South Korean singer
Lee Jae-won (born 1980), South Korean DJ and singer
Choi Jung-won (born 1981), South Korean actress
Kim Jae-won (born 1981), South Korean actor
Kim Rae-won (born 1981), South Korean actor
Lee Jang-won (born 1981), South Korean musician
Lee Ji-won (born 1981), South Korean film director
Lee Si-won (born 1981), South Korean businessman, founder of Siwon School
Kim Won-hyo (born 1981), South Korean actor
Lee Won-hee (born 1981), South Korean quadruple judo champion
Jung Ryeo-won (born 1981), Korean Australian actress 
Lee Chae-won (born 1981), South Korean female cross-country skier
Park Ji-won (born 1982), South Korean actress and former Miss Korea Seoul in 2006
Park Hye-won (born 1983), South Korean female short track speed skater
Kim Won-jung (born 1984), South Korean ice hockey player
Park Si-won (born 1984), South Korean professor, Miss Korea Seoul 2007 and 2009, former child actress
Jung Hye-won (born 1984), South Korean female voice actor
Han Jung-won (born 1984), South Korean basketball player
Jeong Ji-won (born 1985), South Korean female announcer
Jung Won-young (born 1985), South Korean actor
Lee Won-jae (born 1986), South Korean football player
Moon Chae-won (born 1986), South Korean actress
Joo Won (born 1987), South Korean actor
Park Jung-won (born 1987), South Korean actor
Choi Si-won (born 1987), South Korean actor and singer, member of boy band Super Junior
Lee Si-won (born 1987), South Korean actress
Kim Ye-won (born Kim Shin-ah, 1987), South Korean actress and singer
Lee Joo-won (born 1987), South Korean announcer and Miss Korea Chungbuk in 2012
Wang Ji-won (born 1988), South Korean actress and ballet dancer
Kim Ji-won (born 1988), South Korean announcer
Park Hee-won (born 1988), South Korean weathercaster and Miss Korea Gangwon in 2013
Kim Ye-won (born 1989), South Korean singer and actress, former member of girl group Jewelry
Kim Hye-won (born 1989), South Korean actress
Lee Chae-won (born Lee Jae-kyung, 1989), South Korean actress
Cha Jung-won (born Cha Mi-young, 1989), South Korean actress
Lee Won-jae (born 1989), South Korean baseball player
Kim Won-jun (born 1991), South Korean ice hockey defenceman
Lee Won-geun (born 1991), South Korean actor
Shin Won-ho (born 1991), South Korean singer and actor, member of boy group Cross Gene
Moon Do-won (born 1991), South Korean female go professional
Eom Hye-won (born 1991), South Korean female badminton player
Kim Ji-won (born 1992), South Korean actress
Kim Si-won (born 1992), South Korean actor and songwriter
Han Ji-won (born 1992), South Korean former pro gamer
Park Seong-won (born 1993), South Korean female professional golfer
Kim Won-jung (born 1993), South Korean baseball player
Jung Won-jin (born 1994), South Korean soccer player
Yoon Ji-won (born 1994), South Korean actress
Na Hee-won (born 1994), South Korean female professional golfer
Jang Hee-won (born 1994), South Korean female singer-songwriter
Jang Si-won (born 1995), South Korean female professional golfer
Woo Won-jae (born 1996), South Korean rapper
Shin Hye-won (born 1996), South Korean female professional golfer
Johyun (born Shin Ji-won, 1996), South Korean singer member of girl group Berry Good
Kim Ye-won (born 1997), South Korean actress
Choi Won-jun (born 1997), South Korean baseball player
Kim Chae-won (born 1997), South Korean singer, member of girl group April
Park Ji-won (born 1998), South Korean singer, member of girl group Fromis 9
Kim Ji-won (born 1999), member of South Korean girl group Good Day
Kang Hye-won (born 1999), South Korean singer, member of girl group Iz*One
Kim Chae-won (born 2000), South Korean singer, member of girl group Le Sserafim
Oh Hae Won (born 2003), South Korean singer, member of girl group  NMIXX 
Park Chae-won (born 2000), South Korean singer, member of girl group Loona
Jang Won-young (born 2004), South Korean singer, member of girl group Ive (group)
Lee Won-ju (born 2004, English name 'Elleah'), Daughter of Samsung vice chairman Lee Jae-yong
Ahn Lee-won (born 2004), South Korean, daughter of football player and broadcaster Ahn Jung-hwan
Yang Jung-won(born 2004), South Korean singer, member of boy band ENHYPEN
Kal So-won (born 2006), South Korean actress

See also
List of Korean given names
Won (Korean surname)
Won (disambiguation)

References

Korean given names